The Scottish Police Authority (SPA),, is a public body of the Scottish Government which holds Police Scotland, the national police service, to account. Both bodies were established on 1 April 2013 following an announcement on 8 September 2011 in which the Scottish Government confirmed a single police service would be created to replace the existing eight forces, the Scottish Crime and Drug Enforcement Agency, and the Scottish Police Services Authority.

After a further consultation on the detailed operation of the police service, the Police and Fire Reform (Scotland) Bill was published on 17 January 2012. After scrutiny and debate by the Scottish Parliament, the legislation was approved on 27 June 2012. It received royal assent in August.

One of the key provisions of the legislation includes clear responsibilities for the chief constable and, to ensure continued separation from ministers, a new Scottish Police Authority with 11 to 15 members and a remit to hold the chief constable to account.

The Scottish Police Authority is responsible for maintaining the police service. It is accountable to ministers and Parliament and it is supported by a senior officer and small staff team to help it perform its role. Its functions are:
 Allocate resources
 Hold the chief constable to account for all his/her functions, including operational policing
 Appoint senior officers and staff
 Require information and reports from the chief constable if necessary – though the chief constable can appeal to ministers if of the view it might prejudice an operation or the prosecution of offenders
 Prepare and publish a strategic plan and an annual plans setting out objectives, and arrangements for achieving those objectives
 Prepare and publish annual reports assessing progress against objectives
 Establish and maintain forensic services – separate from the chief constable’s direct line of command

Board
The board comprises 10 members. The current board members are:
 Martyn Evans, Chair
 Elaine Wilkinson
 Grant Macrae
 Matt Smith 
 Caroline Stuart
 Robert Hayes
 Tom Halpin 
 Jane Ryder 
 Mary Pitcaithly
 Michelle Miller

The following are appointed with effect from 1 April 2021

 Robert Black
 Paul Edie 
 Alasdair Hay
 Katharina Kasper
 Fiona McQueen 
 Catriona Stewart

See also
His Majesty's Inspectorate of Constabulary for Scotland

References

2013 establishments in Scotland
Law enforcement in Scotland
Organisations based in Glasgow
Government agencies established in 2013
Police authorities of the United Kingdom
Governance of policing in Scotland